Cirsium tuberosum is a species of flowering plant belonging to the family Asteraceae.

Its native range is Europe.

References

tuberosum